Liz & Dick is a 2012 American biographical drama television film chronicling the relationship of Elizabeth Taylor and Richard Burton. It was directed by Lloyd Kramer, written by Christopher Monger, and produced by Larry A. Thompson. The film stars Lindsay Lohan as Taylor and Grant Bowler as Burton. It premiered on Lifetime on November 25, 2012.

Synopsis 
Throughout the film, Elizabeth and Richard appear in a dark room and reminisce about their life together. On August 5, 1984 in Celigny, Switzerland, an elderly Richard is writing what would be his last letter to Elizabeth and recalls the first time he saw her at a Hollywood party. He then finishes the letter and goes to rest.

In July 1961, Richard flies to Rome, Italy to begin filming as Mark Antony in Cleopatra, which stars Elizabeth. He tries to compliment her but it comes off as rude. Later he goes to a restaurant where Elizabeth is dining and attempts to make her like him; again he comes off as rude and she leaves abruptly. His wife Sybil is suspicious of his intentions. Later, during filming of Cleopatra, Elizabeth has a change of heart and invites Richard into her trailer for a drink. However, she accuses him of trying to seduce her.

Eventually they succumb to their attractions and begin an on-set affair that soon makes national news. Later, during a private gathering, Richard publicly asks Elizabeth whether she loves him or her husband, Eddie Fisher. She confesses that she loves him more and splits from Eddie. Richard showers Elizabeth with expensive jewels in Rome, but returns to Sybil after she attempts suicide; Richard and Elizabeth part ways after Sybil refuses to divorce him. Elizabeth is briefly hospitalized for overdosing on pills and Cleopatras filming ends bitterly.

Three months later, Elizabeth is relaxing in Gstaad, Switzerland with her family, but feels bored. She meets up with Richard and they resume their affair. When she learns that Richard will be filming The V.I.P.s (1963) with Sophia Loren, she convinces the film's director Anthony Asquith to fire Loren and hire her, which he eventually does. The relationship is derailed again when Sybil and Eddie refuse to divorce them; then Sybil gives Richard a divorce. They are heavily criticized by the media; their union is labeled "erotic vagrancy" by The Vatican. Eddie divorces Elizabeth, who marries Richard in March 1964.

The couple sign on to film Who's Afraid of Virginia Woolf?, in which their characters have long arguments, as they do. Richard is saddened after missing out on an Academy Award for the film The Spy Who Came in from the Cold (1965). Elizabeth begins gaining weight and becomes insecure. They are both Academy Award-nominated for their roles in Who's Afraid of Virginia Woolf?, but only Elizabeth wins, causing Richard to become hostile again.

To escape the media, the couple travel to Portofino and buy a yacht, where they reside—and constantly fight. He makes a remark about her "pudgy fingers" and promptly apologizes. She asks him to buy her a ring and he purchases a 69-carat diamond which becomes known as The Taylor-Burton Diamond. Richard's brother Ifor Jenkins becomes crippled by an accident Richard blames himself for; after Richard and Elizabeth have returned home, Ifor dies. Richard becomes depressed and starts cheating on Elizabeth and drinking. They decide to divorce.

Months later, Elizabeth experiences a colon cancer health scare and asks to see Richard. She turns out to be fine, Richard realizes he needs her in his life, and they remarry in Africa; unfortunately, they re-divorce mere months later.

Richard dies in his sleep in Celigny. Elizabeth's mother Sara informs her of his death, and she faints. His wife bans her from attending his funeral; the next week she visits his grave in Celigny—yet another moment with him that is intruded on by the paparazzi.

Cast 
 Lindsay Lohan as Elizabeth Taylor
 Grant Bowler as Richard Burton
 Theresa Russell as Sara Taylor
 David Hunt as Ifor Jenkins
 Bruce Nozick as Bernard
 Tanya Franks as Sybil Burton
 Andy Hirsch as Eddie Fisher
 Charles Shaughnessy as Anthony Asquith
 David Eigenberg as Ernest Lehman
 Creed Bratton as Darryl Zanuck
 Adam J. Yeend as The VIP's 1st AD
 Taylor Ann Thompson as Kate Burton, age 10
 Trevor Thompson as Christopher Wilding, age 7
 Brian Howe as Joseph Mankiewicz
 Henry Hereford as London Hotel Manager
 Michael Matucci as Gianni Bulgari

Production

Conception 
Hollywood actress Elizabeth Taylor and Welsh actor Richard Burton first met on the set of their 1963 film Cleopatra, in which they played Antony and Cleopatra, two of the most "famous lovers in history", while married to others. Their affair became one of the most widespread scandals at the time. Michael Thornton of The Daily Telegraph described the relationship, that saw the couple marry and divorce twice, as the "tempestuous saga of Liz and Dick". Their love was described as an addiction; shortly prior to her death, Taylor stated: "The truth is I now don't give a damn about most of those men. Richard is the only one I truly loved and still care about. I shall miss him until the day I die", referring to her various marriages.

Taylor and Burton have been referred to as "the most turbulent love story ever told", with Marie Claire opining: "their union was probably the most notorious and dramatic of the 20th century". Despite the end of their tumultuous relationship, Burton remained in love with Taylor, writing thousands of notes about his love for her in a secret diary until his death in August 1984.

Following Taylor's death in March 2011, speculation arose about a film based on her life. In May, during their upfront presentation to advertisers, Lifetime announced that they would develop a biopic chronicling the relationship of Taylor and Burton, entitled Elizabeth & Richard: A Love Story.

Pre-production 

For the role of Taylor, producer Larry Thompson created a short list of actresses to play the part, including Megan Fox, Lindsay Lohan, Olivia Wilde, and Kate Beckinsale. Lohan and Fox, who worked together on 2004's Confessions of a Teenage Drama Queen, were considered the two strongest contenders for the role.

Lohan's casting as Taylor was confirmed on April 23, 2012, with Rob Sharenow, Lifetime's Executive Vice-President of Programming, stating: "We are thrilled Lindsay will portray beloved Hollywood legend Elizabeth Taylor. She is one of the rare actresses who possesses the talent, beauty and intrigue to capture the spirit of such a provocative icon". Lohan, who has "always admired and had enormous respect for Elizabeth Taylor", stated that she was "very honored" to have been chosen to play the role. Lohan had previously posed as Taylor on the June 2006 cover of Interview magazine. To prepare for the role, Lohan hired a voice coach and dyed her auburn hair a deep brunette to "better match Taylor's dark tresses".

In an interview with The Hollywood Reporter Thompson stated that the biggest challenge for the film was the decision to cast Lohan. He stated that he was keen of her playing the role of Taylor, but was not "sure of her level of commitment". Thompson also revealed that the producers faced issues with insuring Lohan, stemming from her various legal and medical issues. He stated that: "Lindsay Lohan may be the most insured actress that ever walked on a soundstage." According to Thompson, "a lot of people" were shocked by the casting of Lohan.

For the role of Burton, the producers wanted to cast someone who was Welsh or at least British. On May 24, 2012, two weeks before filming was set to begin, Grant Bowler was confirmed to have been cast as Burton. Bowler, who is from New Zealand, was cast after a reading with Lohan, having had the most impressive audition tape, according to Thompson. He stated that Bowler has the "testosterone, looks, intelligence and the voice we needed for Burton". Thompson remarked that: "Grant will add gravitas to our couple and bring to life one of the greatest actors who has ever lived."

Filming 
On June 8, while on her way to the film's set, Lohan's rented Porsche collided into the back of an 18-wheeler on the Pacific Coast Highway. Lohan and her assistant were taken to UCLA Medical Center, with Lohan being released within 2 hours. As the film's producers had hired a car to transport Lohan to and from the set, Thompson expressed frustration and confusion over why she had taken her own vehicle. Lohan refused to postpone filming for the day and instead covered up her "bumps and bruises with make-up".

On June 15, the fire department paramedics were called to Lohan's penthouse at the Ritz-Carlton Hotel. Lohan, who had been working a "grueling schedule" over a period of a few days, working through the night into the early morning, took a nap before shooting her final scene of the day. Steve Honig, Lohan's rep, told Entertainment Weekly that the producers were "concerned when she did not come out of her room and called paramedics as a precaution. Lindsay was examined and is fine, but did suffer some exhaustion and dehydration." She continued to film her scenes for the film that afternoon.

On June 20, it was revealed that production on Liz & Dick was under investigation by the SAG-AFTRA and IATSE labor unions for overworking its actors and members of its film crew after Lohan and two crew members received medical treatment for exhaustion and dehydration. A representative for SAG-AFTRA issued a statement stating: "We're looking into this matter, but can't yet provide any verified information". Thompson denied the allegations, stating that: "We have not been contacted by anyone at SAG-AFTRA about any complaint ... [nor] by anyone at IATSE about any investigation ... We are in total compliance with all Guild regulations on Liz & Dick." Filming for Liz & Dick wrapped on July 3.

Styling 
According to Thompson, wardrobe is a "part of the magic" in a film. The film contains 117 costume changes between Lohan and Bowler, with Lohan having 66 different costumes. Thompson had some of Taylor's most famous jewelry recreated for the film, including the 33-carat Krupp Diamond. Lohan also wore several of Taylor's vintage dresses for the film. Lohan's hair and makeup spans all of Taylor's looks, "from the long lashes and red lips of the 1950s and the Cleopatra-inspired eyeliner and nude mouth of the '60s to her teased '80s bouffant, always with her trademark eyeliner to accentuate her famous violet eyes." Lohan also wore opalescent lavender contact lenses for the role.

Academy Award-winning hair and make-up artist Beatrice de Alba was hired as head of the film's hair department, helping to craft the many wigs used in the film. Lohan brought in her own makeup to be used, consisting of Chanel, Dior and M.A.C products. Alba stated that: "She [Lohan] looks so much like her. There was a moment when she saw her picture on the monitor and said 'I'm her.' It was thrilling."

Release

Marketing 
On June 5, the first official photo was released of Lohan and Bowler in their roles of Taylor and Burton. Lohan has a black bob, smoky eye makeup, and lipstick, with Bowler kissing her neck. The photo was released in black and white to give it a "classic" look. Two additional promotional images were released the next day, one of Lohan and one of Bowler. On July 20, a 15-second promo spot for Liz & Dick aired during Lifetime's Project Runway season 10 premiere. The promo features an image of Lohan as Taylor, and the words: "Lindsay Lohan is Elizabeth Taylor". Three stills of Lohan taken from the film were released on August 30. The first promotional poster for Liz & Dick was revealed on September 19, 2012. Lohan is seen wearing dark red lipstick and draped in diamonds. Alongside Lohan are the words that describe Taylor's story: "controversial love affairs", "diamonds", "provocative", "scandal", "tabloid front page", "child star",  "leading lady", and "paparazzi". On September 28, a behind-the-scenes featurette was released. During the film's premiere, Lifetime promoted a live discussion with the hashtag trend "Liz and Dick" on social networking website Twitter, which quickly became popular and was used by various celebrities.

U.S. television ratings 
The film premiered on Lifetime on November 25, 2012. Bringing in 3.5 million viewers, Liz & Dick became the fourth most-watched movie that aired on the channel in 2012, behind Steel Magnolias (6.5 million), Drew Peterson: Untouchable (5.8 million) and Abducted: The Carlina White Story (3.5 million). The film drew 1.3 million adults 25–54 and 1.3 million adults 18–49, "with women making up the great majority of viewers in both demos". Ratings were lower than expected given the amount of press coverage the film received. Variety described the ratings as "a disappointment with all the pre-debut buzz the project was getting in social media outlets", as well as the publicity that came from Lohan portraying Taylor.

Home video 
Liz & Dick was released on DVD in the United States on May 14, 2013.

Reception

Critical response 
Liz & Dick received generally negative reviews from contemporary film critics. At Metacritic, which assigns a rating out of 100 to reviews from mainstream critics, the film received an average score of 26, which indicates "generally unfavorable reviews", based on 27 reviews.  Joanne Ostrow of The Denver Post stated that "no matter what you think of the actors, the great period stylings, not to mention Cleopatra-period costumes, make this jewel-encrusted, cocktail-soaked, often tragic saga a rip-roaring good time". Matt Roush of TV Guide panned the film, calling it "an epic of pathetic miscasting" and "laughably inept". David Wiegand of the San Francisco Chronicle stated that the film is "so terrible, you'll need to ice your face when it's over to ease the pain of wincing for two hours" and "the performances range from barely adequate to terrible. That would be Bowler in the "barely adequate" slot and Lohan, well, in the other one." Jeff Simon of The Buffalo News noted, based on a consensus of other reviews, that "it's the howler everyone expected" and openly mused that the film could end Lohan's acting career. The Hollywood Reporter called Lohan's performance in Liz & Dick "spectacularly bad", likening her take on Elizabeth Taylor as "half train wreck, half SNL skit". Entertainment Weekly mocked the actress's "frozen face" and "blank stare" and called the film a "dinky, tin-eared production". Rob Salem of the Toronto Star criticized the film's script written by Christopher Monger as being "written in crayon".

Not all reviews were totally negative. Joyce Slaton of Common Sense Media thought the film to be "campy and overwrought", but "great fun". Bill Harris of QMI Agency chastised his fellow critics when he reviewed the film for the Toronto Sun, writing:

He concluded by stating that he thinks Bowler did a terrific job, "And Lindsay Lohan? Well, at least keep your expectations realistic, okay?"

References

External links 

 
 
 
 
 

2012 television films
2012 films
2012 biographical drama films
2012 in American television
2010s American films
2010s English-language films
Adultery in films
American biographical drama films
American drama television films
Biographical films about actors
Biographical television films
Cultural depictions of Richard Burton
Films about Elizabeth Taylor
Films about filmmaking
Films directed by Lloyd Kramer
Films scored by Lee Holdridge
Films set in the 1960s
Films set in the 1970s
Films set in 1984
Films set in Italy
Films set in Switzerland
Films shot in Los Angeles
Lifetime (TV network) films